A bareboat charter or demise charter is an arrangement for the chartering or hiring of a ship or boat, whereby no crew or provisions are included as part of the agreement; instead, the people who rent the vessel from the owner are responsible for taking care of such things. This act is commonly known as bareboating or bareboat charter.

There are legal differences between a bareboat charter and other types of charter arrangements, commonly called time or voyage charters. In a voyage or time charter, the charterer charters the ship (or part of it) for a particular voyage or for a set period of time. In these charters, the charterer can direct where the ship will go but the owner of the ship retains possession of the ship through its employment of the master and crew. In a bare-boat or demise charter, on the other hand, the owner gives possession of the ship to the charterer and the charterer hires its own master and crew. The bare-boat charterer is sometimes called a "disponent owner". The giving up of possession of the ship by the owner is the defining characteristic of a bareboat or demise charter.

In shipping 
In a bareboat charter, no administration or technical maintenance is included as part of the agreement. The charterer obtains possession and full control of the vessel along with the legal and financial responsibility for it.  The charterer pays for all operating expenses, including fuel, crew, port expenses and P&I and hull insurance.

A bareboat charter is in effect a financing arrangement.  It is generally considered a lease contract, specifically a finance lease, for accounting purposes, under both international financial reporting standards (IFRS 16) and US accounting standards.

In yachting 
In yachting a bareboat charter is usually for a short period.  There are hundreds of bareboat yacht charter brokers or agent companies. These companies offer yacht finding and travel organisation services similar to travel agent only more specialized. Their purpose is to use their experience and networks to locate a client's ideal bareboat in terms of price and location. Much like online travel agencies that sell unsold inventory of airline tickets and hotel rooms at a fraction of the price, there are now also last minute bareboat charter brokers where travellers can find excellent rates.

While bareboat technically refers to any boat that can be chartered without a skipper or crew, typically bareboating refers to sailing yachts, including monohulls and catamarans.

Bareboat hire has become increasingly common since the mid-1990s and in particular since the early 2000s. There has been increasing demand for yacht vacations and many experienced and semi-experienced ‘yachties’ now consider it easier and cheaper to hire a bareboat, rather than own their own yacht. While both the international leisure travel industry (particularly outdoor activities based vacations) and the boating industry have boomed in the last  decade, so too has the bareboat charter industry which incorporates both of these pursuits. Bareboat chartering is extremely common in Caribbean islands such as the British Virgin Islands.

In the USA there is an additional legal distinction with regard to bareboat versus for hire, or "skippered" charters. When persons pool their finances to bareboat so that the qualified master among them may skipper for the group, even though the master is not ostensibly a paid skipper, he/she now takes on the legal responsibilities of one. This can have far-reaching consequences in the event of negative occurrences at sea.

See also 
 Yacht charter broker
 Luxury yachts
 Yacht charter
 Skippered charter
 Bareboating
 Dry lease

References

Further reading

External links 
 "Ruling could end sweet 'bare-boat' deals", SEATTLE POST-INTELLIGENCER, November 10, 2004

Yachting
Ship chartering
Leasing